Bite the Dust is a 2013 film directed by Taisia Igumentseva. It was screened out-of-competition at the 2013 Cannes Film Festival.

Synopsis
The handful of inhabitants of a tiny and isolated contemporary Russian rural village receive the news from state media that 90% of humanity is about to perish due to a coronal mass ejection. The old man of the village doesn't believe the news ("But the president said so!" "Ah, who cares what he says. That's his job, to say stuff!"), but nonetheless the village prepares one last party as they await the apocalypse, a party at which all the secret thoughts and desires of the villagers will be revealed and manifested in the belief that the end is nigh.

External links

2013 films
2010s Russian-language films
2013 comedy-drama films
Russian comedy-drama films